Aldiko is an e-book reader application for the Android and iOS operating systems. It supports the EPUB format for digital publications and incorporates facilities for browsing online catalogs on thousands of books (including thousands of free public domain work) and downloading them directly into the user's personal library. The application features a bookshelf-like user interface that lets user navigate their collection of eBooks. It also provides a customizable reading experience through configurable font and background color, font size and type, margin size, display brightness, page turn mode, etc. Additionally, the application allows users to import their own books to read them on the go. Aldiko does not support font embedding.

Features
Features on debut:
 In-app browsing and downloading capability
 Read detailed descriptions before purchase & download
 Adjust front, background, link, layout & text alignment
 Day/Night themes: switch between day/night mode when reading in high/low-luminosity areas
 Brightness Control
 Customizable navigation modes
 Full support for Table of Contents
 Quickly resume reading: the app automatically opens a book where users last left off
 Bookmarks: allows users to create their own bookmarks anywhere in a book to remember sections of interest
 Progress: allows users to check their reading progress in a chapter and in a book
 Share: allows users to recommend books to others via email, Facebook, Twitter, SMS...
 The reading engine automatically adjusts to the size of the device’s display 
 Library management: books can be organized by Tags or Collections 
 Edit detailed book information (title, author, tag, collection, rating)
 Sort books by title, author, download late, last read date or rating

After the app's debut, a number of features have been added, including:
 Import: allows users to import their own books to read them on the go
 Option to turn pages with volume keys
 Option to change the cover art of a book 
 Open images within a book in a separate viewer
 Open links within a book on browser 
 Backward/forward functions: allows users to go back to where they were before clicking a link to a different section of the book
 Full text search: allows users to search any word globally within a book
 Dictionary lookup: allows users to look up any word definition in dictionary, Wikipedia or on Google
 Option to lock display orientation
 Option to set text alignment to left, justify or right
 Go To: allows users to quickly access any position within a book
 Option to Enable/Disable CSS Style Sheet
 Support for Adobe DRM

Online catalog 
The company (Aldiko Limited) behind the app has partnered with a number of content partners to offer in-app purchasing and downloading capability, including Feedbooks, Smashwords, All Romance Ebooks and O'Reilly Media. The company also said that they are working to establish partnerships with more content providers.

Standalone book applications 
On September 23, 2009, the company announced on their blog that multiple standalone book applications had been built on top of Aldiko Book Reader. The standalone book apps were based on titles from O’Reilly.

External links
Review of Aldiko by the Gadgeteer
Review of Aldiko by AndroidGuys
Google Play Store Link (Free)
Google Play Store Link (Premium)
Apple App Store (Free)

EPUB readers
Android (operating system) software